This is a list of 2005 events that occurred in Europe.

Events

January

February

March

April 
April 24 – Fernando Alonso wins the San Marino Grand Prix against Michael Schumacher, starting the Alonso–Schumacher rivalry

May

June

July

August

September

October

November

December

Deaths

January

February

March

April

May

References 

 
2000s in Europe
Years of the 21st century in Europe